Heidi Lynne Gluck is a Canadian-American musician, singer, and songwriter, based in Lawrence, Kansas. She is a multi-instrumentalist solo artist, band member, producer, and studio musician. To date, Gluck has released two EPs, "The Only Girl in the Room" (2015) and "Pony Show" (2016). She has also been a member of several bands, including Margot & the Nuclear So and So's and Some Girls. She has appeared on recordings for numerous other artists, including June Panic.

Discography

References

Living people
Musicians from Winnipeg
Canadian accordionists
Women accordionists
Canadian women guitarists
21st-century Canadian multi-instrumentalists
Canadian rock bass guitarists
Canadian rock keyboardists
Canadian rock pianists
Canadian women pianists
Women bass guitarists
Canadian women drummers
21st-century Canadian bass guitarists
21st-century Canadian pianists
21st-century Canadian drummers
21st-century Canadian guitarists
21st-century Canadian keyboardists
Canadian women singer-songwriters
Canadian singer-songwriters
21st-century accordionists
21st-century Canadian women singers
Year of birth missing (living people)
Musicians from Lawrence, Kansas
21st-century women guitarists
21st-century women pianists